Angelika Bachmann (born 16 May 1979) is a former professional German tennis player. Her highest WTA singles ranking is 130th, which she reached on 17 April 2000. Her career high in doubles of world no. 90 set on 18 December 2000. Angelika Bachmann retired from tennis 2010.

ITF finals

Singles: 5 (2–3)

External links 
 
 

1979 births
Living people
Tennis players from Munich
German female tennis players